The H.I.V.E., which stands for the Hierarchy of International Vengeance and Extermination, is a fictional terrorist organization appearing in American comic books published by DC Comics.

The H.I.V.E. organization has appeared in Teen Titans and the fourth season of The CW show Arrow.

Publication history
The H.I.V.E. first appeared in The New Teen Titans #2 and were created by Marv Wolfman and George Pérez.

Fictional team history

1st incarnation

The H.I.V.E. Master gathered seven unnamed criminal scientists to assist him in taking over the world and eliminating Superman and the Teen Titans. H.I.V.E.'s first known plot involved kidnapping Lois Lane and removing her memories. They subsequently attempted to learn more about the return of Superman Island from space, and hired Deathstroke the Terminator to kill the New Titans. H.I.V.E. was also responsible for turning Deathstroke's son Grant Wilson into Ravager.

Later, the H.I.V.E. Mistress murdered her husband and took control of his organization. Although clearly insane, she nevertheless garnered the same obedience from her underlings as her husband once did. She initiated an ambitious scheme called Operation: Waterworks wherein she attempted to destroy the underwater city of Atlantis. This was meant to be little more than a display of power which she would then use to blackmail world leaders into surrendering to the H.I.V.E. The Mistress' plan alerted the attention of former Titans members Aqualad and Aquagirl who in turn sought assistance from the Titans. The Teen Titans journeyed to the H.I.V.E.'s undersea base for one final confrontation. They succeeded in staving off the attack against Atlantis and also crippled the H.I.V.E.'s station. Knowing that defeat was near, the H.I.V.E. Mistress refused to be taken alive. She murdered her Inner Circle then took her own life. With her demise, this incarnation of the H.I.V.E. was gone forever.

Remnants of this incarnation of the H.I.V.E. were revealed to have become members of the Wildebeest Society.

2nd incarnation
The second incarnation of the H.I.V.E. was established by Adeline Kane, Deathstroke's ex-wife. They were tracked down by Tartarus, led by Vandal Savage and made up of Gorilla Grodd, Lady Vic, Red Panzer, Siren, and Cheshire.

The H.I.V.E. is later seen as members of Alexander Luthor Jr.'s Secret Society of Super Villains with the H.I.V.E. falling under the leadership of Queen Bee.

The New 52
Following the 2011 Flashpoint miniseries and the "New 52" reboot, the H.I.V.E. acronym was reimagined as Holistic Integration for Viral Equality. Additionally, the organization formed an uneasy alliance with Green Lantern villain Hector Hammond. They are led by a world class telepath named the H.I.V.E. Queen who is a zealous devotee of the alien Brainiac, claiming to be his "daughter". To the public, H.I.V.E. is a social media company that connects people to each other. However, their true goal is to kidnap humans with psychic powers and harness their energies in order to mentally enslave the world for Brainiac's return. Their criminal activities become publicly known following the Psi War storyline, when a roster of powerful telepaths clash in Metropolis. During the battle, their main headquarters located beneath Metropolis is destroyed and their entire plan thwarted.

In a flashback seen during the Forever Evil storyline, the H.I.V.E. were responsible for an act that turned S.T.A.R. Labs scientist Dr. Caitlin Snow into Killer Frost when she threatened their control of the energy market.

H.I.V.E. is later featured in Red Hood/Arsenal. A group of H.I.V.E. soldiers, led by the H.I.V.E. Regal, have planted a "transubstantiation bomb" aboard a U.S. Navy ship set to go off during a ceremony. Once the bomb goes off, it is supposed to release a psionic virus that will infect all the U.S. Military personnel present with the goals and ideals of H.I.V.E. However, Red Hood and Arsenal infiltrate the ship during the ceremony and Arsenal disables the bomb while Red Hood fights off the soldiers and kills the H.I.V.E. Regal.

H.I.V.E. returns in Teen Titans Vol. 4. During a trip to New Orleans, the city suddenly comes under psionic attack from the H.I.V.E. Queen who quickly seizes control of every mind in New Orleans except the Titans who are shielded by Raven's magic. The mind-controlled citizens then start building psionic amplifiers that will allow the Queen to expand her powers across the whole of the U.S. Managing to triangulate her location, Red Robin and Raven assault her base and defeat the H.I.V.E. Queen, freeing everyone from her mental control.

DC Rebirth
In 2016, DC Comics implemented another relaunch of its books called "DC Rebirth" which restored its continuity to a form much as it was prior to "The New 52". The H.I.V.E. are revealed to be the financial backers behind Meta Solutions, a company set up by the Fearsome Five. Its purpose was to steal the powers of metahumans and sell them to the H.I.V.E. on the black market. The company was taken down and Fearsome Five are defeated by the Titans. H.I.V.E. is shown to have a history with the Titans and was revealed to have hired Deathstroke's son Grant Wilson. His assignment was to kill the Titans. To this end, they granted him various superhuman powers, but the strain proved too much and he died of a heart attack before he could complete his mission.

Membership
There are different memberships in each incarnation. Here is a list of its known memberships:

First H.I.V.E.
 H.I.V.E. Mistress -
 Franklin Crandall -
 Penelope Lord -
 Otto Muller - Known as a mad scientist aka "Extractor".

Second H.I.V.E.
 Adeline Wilson (née Kane) - The H.I.V.E. Mistress of the second incarnation of H.I.V.E.
 Damien Darhk -

The New 52 H.I.V.E.
 Hector Hammond -
 H.I.V.E. Queen (leader) -
 H.I.V.E. Regal -
 Dreadnought -
 Psiphon -
 Psycho-Pirate - He was their prisoner.
 Doctor Psycho - He was their prisoner.
 Unnamed foot soldiers -

Alternate versions

Anti-Matter Universe
The H.I.V.E.'s heroic counterparts in the antimatter universe in JLA: Earth 2 are known as the Hierarchy for International Virtuous Empowerment.

Flashpoint
In the alternate timeline of the Flashpoint event, the H.I.V.E. council members: Adeline Kane, August General in Iron, Captain Nazi, Dr. Kimiyo Hoshi, Impala, Naif al-Sheikh, Prince Osiris, Ra's al Ghul, and Red Star are taking a vote which will decide if they should be against using nuclear weapons to end the war in Western Europe between Aquaman and Wonder Woman. Though the majority of them votes yes, they are stopped by Kane's daughter followed by Kane starting the attack alone.

In other media

Television
 The H.I.V.E. appears in Teen Titans. This version of the organization is a regular evil organization that also consists of the H.A.E.Y.P. ("H.I.V.E. Academy for Extraordinary Young People"), also known simply as the H.I.V.E. Academy, which was founded by an unnamed headmistress (voiced by Andrea Romano), consists of Mammoth, Gizmo, Jinx, and series original characters Private H.I.V.E., Billy Numerous, See-More, Kid Wykkyd, Angel, XL Terrestrial, the I.N.S.T.I.G.A.T.O.R., and Wrestling Star as notable students, is staffed by multiple cloaked faculty, and armed H.I.V.E. Troopers. Additionally, Bumblebee and Cyborg infiltrated the academy as students. In the episode "Final Exam", the headmistress loans graduates Mammoth, Gizmo, and Jinx to Slade, who tasks the trio with attacking the Teen Titans and giving them his name in preparation for his plans. In the third season, Brother Blood takes over the academy following the headmistress' disappearance and has Mammoth, Gizmo, and Jinx sent back for their repeated failure to defeat the Titans. Following a failed attempt at swaying Cyborg, who successfully destroys the academy, Blood develops a rivalry with him while several academy students form the H.I.V.E. Five and, along with the headmistress, join the Brotherhood of Evil.
 The H.I.V.E. appears in series set in the Arrowverse.
 Primarily appearing in the fourth season of Arrow, this version of the group, also known by Star City's media as the "Ghosts", is a decades-old organization led by Damien Darhk, who is served by supporters from around the world willing to commit suicide if they are captured by authorities and Milo Armitage and Phaedra Nixon as lieutenants. They intend to initiate a nuclear holocaust while protecting themselves in an "Ark" under Star City so they can lead humanity's remnants. While they are foiled and dismantled by the Green Arrow and his allies, one of H.I.V.E.'s nuclear missiles destroys the town of Havenrock and goes on to inspire the Ragman.
 The H.I.V.E. makes a cameo appearance in the crossover event "Heroes Join Forces".
 A past version of the H.I.V.E. from 1975 makes a minor appearance in Legends of Tomorrows two-part pilot episode. 
 The H.I.V.E. Five appears in Teen Titans Go! (2013), consisting of Jinx, Gizmo, Mammoth, See-More, and Billy Numerous.
 The H.I.V.E. appears in Justice League Action. This version of the organization is led by an unidentified H.I.V.E. Master (voiced by Chris Diamantopoulos in his first appearance and Diedrich Bader in his second appearance) and consists of bee-themed foot soldiers who utilize honey-based traps.

Video games
The H.I.V.E. appears in DC Universe Online. This version of the organization is led by Queen Bee and consists of H.I.V.E. Drones, H.I.V.E. Foragers, H.I.V.E. Killer Bees, H.I.V.E. Recruits, H.I.V.E. Royal Drones, H.I.V.E. Stingers, H.I.V.E. Workers, Mortuary Bees, a H.I.V.E. Minder, and Major Honeygut as foot soldiers.

Miscellaneous
 The H.I.V.E. appears in Teen Titans Go! (2004), with original members Rock, who can transmute her body into a rock-like form; Paper, who possesses an elastic body; and Scissors, who can turn his fingers into talons, appearing in issue #16.
 The H.I.V.E. appears in Deathstroke: Knights & Dragons, with the Jackal leading a sect and Rose Wilson serving as the "H.I.V.E. Queen".

References

Comic book terrorist organizations
Characters created by George Pérez
Characters created by Marv Wolfman
Comics characters introduced in 1980
DC Comics organizations
DC Comics supervillain teams